Kandebash is a village development committee in Baglung District in the Dhaulagiri Zone of Western Nepal. At the time of the 1991 Nepal census it had a population of 2,510 and had 442 houses in the town.

References

Populated places in Baglung District